Kraśnik may refer to the following places:
Kraśnik in Lublin Voivodeship (east Poland)
Kraśnik, Świętokrzyskie Voivodeship (south-central Poland)
Kraśnik, West Pomeranian Voivodeship (north-west Poland)